Mirko Bibic is a Canadian businessman who is President and CEO of BCE Inc. and its wholly-owned subsidiary Bell Canada.

Education and early career
Bibic was raised in Montreal by immigrant parents; his father, Veljko, was a carpenter from Serbia while his mother was an administrator born in France. He is a graduate of both McGill University and the University of Toronto Faculty of Law.

Bibic began his career as a lawyer with the law firm Stikeman Elliott. He became the managing partner of the firm's City of Ottawa office in 2003.

BCE Inc./Bell Canada
Bibic joined Bell in 2004 as Senior Vice President, Regulatory, and has since served as Executive Vice President, Corporate Development and as Chief Legal and Regulatory Officer. Mirko was promoted to COO of BCE Inc. in October 2018. In 2019, Bibic was accused on malfeasances when he was seen meeting with CRTC chief Ian Scott one week after Bell filed their appeal of the CRTC's 2019 wholesale rates.

Bibic succeeded the retiring George A. Cope as President and CEO of BCE Inc. in January 2020.

Other interests
In 2022, he was named to the Board of Directors for the Royal Bank of Canada.

References

Living people
Chief executive officers
University of Toronto alumni
Year of birth missing (living people)
Canadian chief executives
Canadian people of Serbian descent
Canadian people of French descent